This is a glossary of terms that relate to flamenco arts.

A
aficionado one interested in flamenco ('afición' a liking for)
aflamencado flamencoized
a golpe A tap, it can refer to a particular footstep by the dancer or a tap on the guitar, but it can also just refer to any tap (i.e. tapping the table in compás)
alboreá the Gypsy wedding song sung in the soleá compás
alegrías festive compás of the cantiñas group; one of the cantes chicos
alzapúa guitar-playing technique that uses solely the thumb
ángel see duende
a palo seco without accompaniment
apodo nickname, which Gypsies receive for life
arranque spontaneous outbursts of uncontrolled emotion that a performer may emit
a seco playing the guitar rasgueado, with the fingers of the left hand damping the strings
atravesarse for the guitarist - cutting corners and rhythm during a falseta, making the dancer's job difficult

B
babeo repeated meaningless sounds such as 'bababa' in the middle of words
bailaor, bailaora flamenco dancer (male, female), as opposed to 'bailarin', which is any other dancer.
baile flamenco dance; other (non-flamenco) types are referred to as 'danza'
baile de mantón a dance with a shawl
balanceo y vaivén swaying of the body and hips. Balanceo is gentle; vaiven is violent
bamberas song form for swings
bata de cola dress with a train (literally: "gown [of/with] a tail")
bonito "pretty"; in other words, not good flamenco
braceo a dancer's use of the arms
bulerías song form; an evolving rhythm that started about a century ago
bullanguero festive; adjectival form of bulerias

C
cabal final version of the siguiriya; literally, honest, exact, complete.
café cantante prime venue for flamenco in the 19th century
cambio change of key and lightening of tone to end a song
campanilleras songs that originally came from a religious brotherhood who would go to prayers to the sound of handbells - hence the name, which means "bellringers"
cantaor, cantaora flamenco singer (male, female); other singers are often called a 'cantantes'
cante flamenco song; other (non-flamenco) songs are cantos
cante pa'adelante literally, "singing from in front"; singing not done for dancers, often with the singer seated [pa = "por"]
cante pa'atras literally, "singing from behind"; singing for dancers, often with the singer standing [pa = "por"]
cantes de ida y vuelta songs brought back from Latin America
cantes de levante songs from the eastern province of Grandada, Jaen, Almeria, and Murcia
caracoles a song form which started as a street snail-vendor's song in Zarzuela (a popular Spanish form of operetta)
cartageneras song form derived from the taranta, with a florid vocal line, more "artistic" and decorative than forceful and rough 
castañuelas castanets
cejilla capotasto or capo, used by guitarists to raise tone of all strings; a mechanical 'barré'
chufla any festive and frivolous song
cierre close of a series of steps or a line of song
coba flattery, often with something false in it
coletilla a short form of estribillo
compás a measure or bar; flamencos use the word to mean both (a) the name of the type of twelve-count and (b) the rhythmic skill of a performer
contratiempo cross-rhythms; including syncopation and rubato
copla verse of cante flamenco, as against the cuple of a (non-flamenco) canto
coraje a way of performing that shows impetuosity or daring (lit. "courage")
corrido ballad, or also a romance
corte the way the singer ends a musical phrase
crótalo Phoenician and Roman form of castanets
cuadro a flamenco troupe

D
debla a form of toná. It is an old song form, now seldom used
dejes the way the singer ends a phrase
desgarro literally "tear, rip"; wilderness, heartbreak
desplante technically, a point in the dance that marks the end of a section. In fact, a high point, a climax in the dance at which the dancer pauses and the audience applauds
desplazamiento: see marcar
diapasón the neck or fingerboard of the guitar
ducas, duquelas Caló (Romany or Gypsi) word for "sorrows"
duende literally, "spirit" of "demon"; suggesting possession. Flamencos may prefer the word ángel or el age

E
escobilla literally "broom"; the section of a dance in which the bailaor/a does an extended zapateados 
escuela bolera a graceful and balletic form of the old bolero; dance in 3/4 time popular in the last century
estampa look, appearance by the stance, positioning, form, and dress
estribillo short phrases sung repeatedly at the end of a song; the last section of a dance done with singing, where the cantaor/a sings while the baile is danced; see 'coletilla'

F
falsetas solo passages on the guitar, short melodies played at the start and between verses of a song
fandangos an old family of song forms; thought to be of Moorish in origin; very popular in the early/mid 20th century
farruca folk song adopted from northern Spain (Galicia), now above all a dance; once "only performed by men"
figura a star; a performer who has achieved a name and fame

G
gachó Caló (Gypsy or Romany) word for non-Gypsy (compare payo)
gancho literally a "hook"; by extension, anything that gets to you, that "hooks" you
garra literally "claws"; guts, force
garrotín song adopted from northern Spain (Asturias)
gesto tapping the face of the guitar with the second and/or third finger while playing
granaína form of Fandango in free rhythm that in many ways stands apart, from Granada
guajira an ida y vuelta song; now meaning "girl", word from Yucateca, a native language of Cuba
guasa joking in bad taste, rustic trickiness
guitarrero guitar builder

H

I
ir con tiento to move slowly

J
jaberas form of Fandango from Malaga
jalear to stimulate a performer, to encourage with words and/or palmas
jaleo vocal encouragement given to performers, when the audience calls out such phrases as ezo!, arsa!, olé!, toma!, vamo 
jarana "spree" when a group enjoys themselves doing flamenco
jipio a cry (such as ay) used by the singer to find his pitch or simply put into the middle of a song
jondo the Gypsy pronunciation on hondo (deep); formerly applied to the song forms, but now used often to describe a manner of singing
juerga a lively flamenco party, often with only cante a golpe.

K

L
letra copla of a song taken at its literary value; section of a dance when the cantaor/a is singing the lyrics, doing the tercios
ligado in guitar, sounding the note with the fingers of the left hand only
llamada literally "call"; the opening of a dance

M
macho usually a three-line verse used as  remate to the siguiriya; usually in a major key
malagueñas song form characterized by its sad, elegiac tone. The city and province of Malaga are considered the home of the flamenco fandango
mutis the exit made off the stage by the bailaor(a)s
marcar to mark time, done by bailaor(a)s, usually while the cantaor(a) is singing; 'marcajes'; see desplazamientos
martinetes songs of the blacksmith, can be performed to the rhythm of hammers beating an anvil; in compás similar to the siguiriya
melisma series of notes sung on a single syllable of the coplas. To the ear unaccustomed to it, the sound may seem like unmusical wailing
milonga a type of folk song from the Río de la Plata area of Argentina, where it is still very popular
mineras best described as watered-down tarantas
mote see apodo
mudanza see punteado

N
nanas lullabyes

O
oposición refers to the asymmetry of flamenco; e.g., in dance, if the arms are going one way the face will look the other

P
Palillos flamenco name for castanets
palmas hand clapping. It is intricate art, requiring skill and knowledge of compas.
palmas altas percussive effect performed with the fingers of the right hand on the left palm, resulting in a sharp sound; also called palmas claras and palmas agudas
palmas sordas muted clapping done with cupped hands (often by the singer); also called palmas graves
palmero performer of palmas
palo song form; literally, a suit of cards. Palos fall into two main categories: those done in free rhythm (sin compás) and those done in rhythm (con compás)
paso step or a series of steps
payo sometimes thought to be the Calo (Romany or Gypsy) word for non-Gypsy, but in fact prison slang for an easy mark, a sucker. The Calo word for non-Gypsy is gachó
pellizco literally, "nip, pinch"; that quality (usually in a dancer) that turns you on
peña flamenco club
peteneras Legendary or real, la Petenera was a girl from Cadiz, notorious for her beauty and hardness of heart. A 19th century writer mentions hearing 'peteneras' sung in a voice that conveyed "inexplicable sadness."
picar to pluck on a guitar
pitos finger snapping
playero lamenting
por arriba on guitar - in the hand position for the key of E
por medio on guitar - in the hand position for the key of A
punteando steps and movements that are not part of the zapateado, including 'paseo' (walking steps) and 'mudanzas' (more complicated movements, lit. "variations")

Q

R
rasgueado on guitar, a drumroll effect created by using the backs of the fingers, i.e., the fingernails, striking the strings one after another (held back by the thumb)
remate way of ending a song, either by raising a pitch, changing to the major, or simply speeding up, in a strong decisive manner
roas Sacromonte form of the alboreá (wedding song)
romances songs (ballads) in a form of toná, now when done with a guitar, it is usually played in a soleá rhythm
romeras songs of a girl traveling on a pilgrimage
rumbas a song form influenced by Cuban rumba

S
Sacromonte a hillside in Granada with cave dwellings, in which Gypsies used to live. It was one of the heartlands of Gypsy flamenco, with a style all its own
salida start of the baile (literally, going or coming out)
saeta a song of passionate devotion to Christ or the Virgin, often aflamencao
sevillanas non-flamenco song that has been flamencoized in various ways due to its popularity, including the hand and arm movements of the dancers
siguiriyas heart of cante jondo (deep song). It expresses anguish, lament and despair, and has been described as an outcry against fate and the quintessence of tragic song
soleares As song, the soleá lies at the heart of flamenco, together with siguiriyas and toná. As dance, it stands alone—at least for women
son all sound accompanying the flamenco song: guitar, palmas (clapping), pitas (finger snappin), knuckle tapping
sonanta flamenco slang for guitar
soniquete literally, "droning"; it is applied to performers being what-jazz-players-call "in the groove"

T
tablao the venue for a tourist-oriented flamenco show
tablas literally, "boards"; the stage on which the dance is performed; tiene tablas means "to be an experienced performer"
tangos probably the oldest flamenco song form in a simple rhythm of 2/4 time, as reflected in the time beaten by the palmeros; not the same as "el tango argentino"
tanguillos songs of Cadiz; festive, light, sometimes mocking, and always suitable for Carnival
tapa the face of the guitar
tarantas a mining song of free rhythm and by far the hardest to sing, demanding tragic intensity as well as unusual control, both vocal and artistic, in the melismas
templar to tune
temple tuning or temperament
temporeas songs of the farm - harvesting and threshing songs
tercio a short section (musical phrase, line of verse); lit. "third"
tientos a song form, similar to the tango
tocaor, tocaora guitarist; from "tocar" (to play)
toná oldest flamenco, gypsy-Andalusian song, probably from romances or corridas
toque guitar playing
torsión y convulsión stages, usually in the soleá, wherein the dancer reaches a more or less ecstatic state
trémolo on guitar, playing high notes with the fingers (or bass notes with the thumb) in quick succession (back and forth) to make a continuous sound
Triana the traditional Gypsy quarter of Sevilla, now yuppified

U

V
vibrato repeated meaningless sounds uttered during the song, such as jajaja, but unlike babeo, not within a word
vito Andalucian folk song and dance in fast 3/8 time (non-flamenco)
voz afillá hoarse voice like that of El Fillo, a 19th-century singer; this quality is also known as rajo

W

X

Y

Z
zambra (a) a form of Sacromonte tangos, (b) a noisy fiesta originally of the Moors
zapateo, zapateado the form of "tap" dancing peculiar to flamenco; from zapato [shoe]
zorongo an old song and dance in 2/4 time (not flamenco), revived by Federico Garcia Lorca; also called 'zarongo'

References

Bibliography
 Andres Batista, Maestros y Estilos. Manual Flamenco (Madrid: Graficas Agenjo 1985); alphabetically arranged.
 Irving Brown, Deep Song (New York: Macmillan 1929); glossary at 337-346.
 Anselmo González Climent, Flamencología (Madrid: Editorial Escelicer 1955, 2d ed. 1964).
 Paul Hecht, The Wind Cried (New York: The Dial Press 1968); glossary at 177-180.
 Julian Pemartin, El Cante Flamenco. Guia alfabetica (Madrid: Edita Afrodisio Aguado 1966); alphabetic guide.
 D. E. Pohren, The Art of Flamenco (Madrid: Society of Spanish Studies 1962, 1990); glossary at 121-124.
 Barbara Thiel-Cramér, Flamenco (Lidingö, Sweden: Remark 1990), English translation 1991; glossary at 147-152.
 Robin Totton, Song of the Outcasts (Portland, Oregon: Amadeus 2003); glossary at 189-199.

External links
 Flamenco glossary at flamenco.org
 Flamenco glossary at novareinna.com

Flamenco
Flamenco
Wikipedia glossaries using description lists